Aleksandr Andreyevich Melikhov (born 23 March 1998) is a Russian football player who plays for Armenian club Urartu.

Club career
He made his debut in the Russian Professional Football League for FC Novokuznetsk on 13 October 2015 in a game against FC Sibir-2 Novosibirsk.

He made his Russian Premier League debut for FC Tom Tomsk on 3 March 2017 in a game against FC Rostov in a 0–6 loss.

On 12 June 2019, he signed a 5-year contract with Russian Premier League club FC Akhmat Grozny.

On 3 August 2022, Melikhov joined Urartu.

Career statistics

References

External links
 Profile by Russian Professional Football League

1998 births
People from Novokuznetsk
Sportspeople from Kemerovo Oblast
Living people
Russian footballers
Association football goalkeepers
Russia under-21 international footballers
FC Novokuznetsk players
FC Tom Tomsk players
FC Akhmat Grozny players
FC Urartu players
Russian Premier League players
Russian First League players
Russian Second League players
Armenian Premier League players
Russian expatriate footballers
Expatriate footballers in Armenia
Russian expatriate sportspeople in Armenia